Anne S. Ulrich (Born December 31, 1966) is a German chemist. She is the director of the Institute of Biological Interfaces (IBG-2) and Chair of Biochemistry at the Karlsruhe Institute of Technology.

Education 
She studied chemistry at the University of Oxford - continued her doctoral work in the laboratory of Anthony Watts - held subsequent research positions as an EMBO-Fellow with Hartmut Oschkinat at the European Molecular Biology Laboratory in Heidelberg and as a Liebig-Fellow with Felix Wieland at the University of Heidelberg - became Associate Professor at the University of Jena - until she moved her group in 2002 to the Karlsruhe Institute of Technology.

Research 
Her research focuses on the structural and functional analysis of biomembranes by solid state NMR. The main systems of interest are:
 Mechanisms of membrane-active peptides with antimicrobial, cell-penetrating, fusogenic, or cytotoxic functions
 Helix-helix interactions of transmembrane segments from signalling receptors, ion channels, and protein translocation systems
 Self-assembly of amyloidogenic peptides and "charge-zipper" proteins in membranes

Personal 
Ulrich comes from a family with strong scientific background.

References 

1966 births
Alumni of St Cross College, Oxford
Living people
German biochemists
German women biochemists
Academic staff of the Karlsruhe Institute of Technology